Vesiyeh Sar (also Romanized as Vesīyeh Sar; also known as Vesī Sar and Vesyeh Sar) is a village in Rastupey Rural District, in the Central District of Savadkuh County, Mazandaran Province, Iran. At the 2006 census, its population was 210, in 65 families.

References 

Populated places in Savadkuh County